Mikey and Nicky is a 1976 American crime drama film written and directed by Elaine May. It stars John Cassavetes as a desperate small-time mobster and Peter Falk as his longtime, childhood friend. The supporting cast features Ned Beatty, Carol Grace, Rosee Arrick, and noted acting teacher Sanford Meisner.

The production ran over its schedule and budget, leading to tensions between May and Paramount Pictures, who revoked her final cut privilege. When finally released on December 21, 1976, the film bombed at the box office, which led to May not directing again for a decade. Her director's cut of the film was screened in 1986; she subsequently made another director's cut, which was released by the Criterion Collection in 2019.

Plot
When Nicky (John Cassavetes) calls Mikey (Peter Falk) yet again to bail him out of trouble—this time a contract on his life for money he stole from his mob boss—Mikey, as always, shows up to help. Overcoming the obstacles of Nicky's paranoia and blind fear, Mikey gets him out of the hotel where he has holed up, and starts to help him plan his escape, but Nicky keeps changing the plan, and a hitman (Ned Beatty) is hot on their trail. As they try to make their escape, the two friends have to confront issues of betrayal, regret, and the value of friendship versus self-preservation.

Cast

Peter Falk	as Mikey
John Cassavetes as Nicky
Ned Beatty as Kinney
Rose Arrick as Annie
Carol Grace as Nellie
William Hickey as Sid Fine
Sanford Meisner as Dave Resnick
Joyce Van Patten as Jan
M. Emmet Walsh as bus driver

Cast notes
May originally cast Paramount president Frank Yablans as a gangster, but Charles Bluhdorn, the chairman of parent company Gulf+Western, was not amused, and demanded that she recast.

Production
The film's original $1.6 million budget grew to $2.2 million, causing original distributor Twentieth Century-Fox Film Corporation to drop the project. May had agreed to deduct any over-budget costs from her salary in exchange for final cut privilege. Paramount picked up the film, with studio President Frank Yablans forming "an ironclad deal" with May for a $1.8 million budget; the agreement also stipulated that the completed film must be delivered to the studio no later than June 1, 1974. Principal photography (which took place at night) began in Philadelphia in May 1973, lasting through August, and continued in Los Angeles from January to March 1974. By the time production wrapped, the budget had grown to nearly $4.3 million. Due to May missing the film's delivery date, litigation between her and Paramount began in 1975, with the studio gaining possession of the film and negating May's final cut privilege.

May shot 1.4 million feet of film, almost three times as much as was shot for Gone with the Wind. By using three cameras that she sometimes left running for hours, May captured spontaneous interaction between Falk and Cassavetes. At one point, Cassavetes and Falk had both left the set and the cameras remained rolling for several minutes. A new camera operator said "Cut!" only to be immediately rebuked by May for usurping what is traditionally a director's command. He protested that the two actors had left the set. "Yes", replied May, "but they might come back".

Post-production
When Paramount assumed control over Mikey and Nicky, May was willing to fight for her film. After losing the lawsuits to get her name removed from A New Leaf, she could not watch Paramount butcher another one of her films. Instead of turning over all of the footage, she hid two important reels of it in her husband's friend's garage in Connecticut. Although Paramount traced the reels to the garage, the company had no legal jurisdiction to search a house outside of the state of New York. May eventually instigated the return of the reels and allowed Paramount to create its cut; she did not direct again for over a decade.

Release 
Angered by May's contentiousness during filming and editing, Paramount booked the completed film into theaters for a few days to satisfy contractual obligations, but did not give the film its full support. Paramount's cut, riddled with continuity errors, was released to the ridicule of critics. This led John Simon to call the film "a celluloid death wish" in a 1976 article in The New Yorker. In 1978, Julian Schlossberg, who had previously worked in acquisitions for Paramount before starting his own company, Castle Hill Productions, purchased the rights from the studio with May and Falk.

A new version of the film, approved by May, was shown at the Museum of Modern Art in New York City for the Directors Guild of America Fiftieth Anniversary Tribute on November 17, 1986. The film was also shown in Park City, Utah, at the United States Film Festival's Tribute to John Cassavetes on January 25, 1989. The film was released on Blu-ray and DVD by The Criterion Collection in 2019.

Reception 
On review aggregator website Rotten Tomatoes, the film holds an approval rating of 88% based on 24 reviews, with an average rating of 7.6/10. According to Metacritic, which assigned a weighted average score of 81 out of 100 based on 15 critics, the film received "universal acclaim".

References

External links

Mikey and Nicky at Turner Classic Movies
Essay by Paul Sherman at Turner Classic Movies
Mikey and Nicky: Difficult Men an essay by Nathan Rabin at the Criterion Collection

1976 films
1976 crime drama films
American crime drama films
American gangster films
Films about dysfunctional families
Films about Jewish-American organized crime
Films directed by Elaine May
Films with screenplays by Elaine May
Films set in Philadelphia
Films shot in Philadelphia
1970s English-language films
1970s American films